Bend Glacier is in the U.S. state of Oregon. Bend Glacier is just to the north of Broken Top, an extinct stratovolcano.

See also
 List of glaciers in the United States

References

External links

Glaciers of Oregon
Glaciers of Deschutes County, Oregon